Brahima Diarra (born 5 July 2003) is a French-Malian professional footballer who plays as a midfielder for Huddersfield Town.

Club career
Born in Paris, France, Diarra started his football career playing for local Parisian club Montrouge F.C. 92, before moving to Athletic Club de Boulogne-Billancourt.

Alongside fellow Frenchman Loick Ayina, he moved to Huddersfield Town in July 2019, and they both signed professional contracts with the club a year later.

Diarra made his senior debut for Huddersfield Town on 12 December 2020, when he played as a substitute in their 5–0 EFL Championship defeat against AFC Bournemouth.

On 4 January 2022, Diarra joined EFL League Two side Harrogate Town on loan for the remainder of the 2021–22 season.

International career
On 17 March 2023, Diarra was selected to play for the Mali national under-23 football team for their Africa U-23 Cup of Nations qualifiers against Senegal U23. Diarra qualifies for Mali, as even though he was born in France, both his parents are from Mali.

References

2003 births
Living people
Footballers from Paris
French footballers
French people of Malian descent
Huddersfield Town A.F.C. players
Harrogate Town A.F.C. players
Association football midfielders
English Football League players
French expatriate footballers
French expatriates in England
Expatriate footballers in England